The Mindbenders were an English beat group from Manchester, England. Originally the backing group for Wayne Fontana, they were one of several acts that were successful in the mid-1960s British Invasion of the US charts, achieving major chart hits with "The Game of Love" (a number-one single with Fontana) in 1965 and "A Groovy Kind of Love" in 1966.

Career 
Wayne Fontana founded the band in June 1963 with Bob Lang, Ric Rothwell, and Eric Stewart. The name of the group was inspired by the title of a 1963 UK feature film, starring the British actor Dirk Bogarde, called The Mind Benders. Before that Fontana had a group called Wayne Fontana and the Jets (from July 1962). Wayne Fontana & the Mindbenders released a number of singles before recording "Um, Um, Um, Um, Um, Um" in 1964, which was to be their first major hit in Britain and led to a tour with Brenda Lee. They also had a No.1 hit in the United States with "The Game of Love" in 1965 (which also reached No.2 on the UK singles chart). The band's self-titled album reached No. 18 in the UK.

After a tour of America and two more singles that were less successful than "The Game of Love", "It's Just a Little Bit Too Late" and "She Needs Love", Fontana left the band in the middle of a concert in 1965. The Mindbenders decided to carry on as a trio—Stewart was the primary lead singer and guitarist, Lang played bass, and Rothwell was the drummer. Both Lang and Rothwell sang backing vocals, and took the occasional lead vocal on album tracks.

The Mindbenders' first single without Fontana was the hit "A Groovy Kind of Love" (a Carole Bayer Sager / Toni Wine composition). The song reached No. 2 in the US (No. 1 on the Cashbox singles chart) and No. 2 in the UK in 1966. It sold one million copies globally. The Mindbenders' 1966 album of the same name managed to reach No. 28 in the UK.

A second song by Bayer and Wine, "Can't Live With You (Can't Live Without You)", had struggled to break the UK Top 30 while the third one, "Ashes to Ashes", took the Mindbenders to No. 14 in the UK Singles Chart in the autumn of 1966.

On 4 July 1966, the Mindbenders began their United States tour in Atlanta, Georgia in front of a capacity 25,000 crowd as the support act for James Brown. It would be their only tour of the United States as The Mindbenders, i.e., without Fontana. Stewart recalled that "we went down quite well", but that later shows at the Fillmore West Auditorium on Friday 8 July and Saturday 9 July 1966 were more memorable. "The liquid light show was great and really worked with our act, which was a lot heavier than on our records."

In September/October 1966 they embarked on a 12 date package tour of England backing Dave Berry of 'The Crying Game' fame. The tour also included Dusty Springfield and The Alan Price Set.

Stewart was developing himself as a songwriter, and wrote "My New Day and Age" for Family. However, the Mindbenders generally sought material from outside the band, with only a handful of B-sides and album tracks being written by Stewart, occasionally in collaboration with Lang and Rothwell.

The band's next project was a loose sort of concept album, several months before Sgt. Pepper's Lonely Hearts Club Band, S.F. Sorrow and Tommy were issued. However, The Mindbenders release With Woman in Mind really had no overarching narrative or story, the 'concept' being simply songs written about relationships with women. The album contained "I Want Her, She Wants Me" (written by Rod Argent of The Zombies), "Ashes to Ashes", and the lascivious "Schoolgirl" (written by Graham Gouldman). The album did not sell well and was not even released in the United States. The accompanying single, another Bayer/Wine composition, "We'll Talk About It Tomorrow" also flopped.

The Mindbenders appeared in the 1967 Sidney Poitier movie, To Sir, with Love and were also on the soundtrack with the songs "Off and Running" (the last Bayer/Wine song recorded by the band) and "It's Getting Harder All the Time". Shortly thereafter, Rothwell quit the band and was replaced by Paul Hancox.  Graham Gouldman became the band's producer around this time; future Led Zeppelin bassist John Paul Jones was also involved in arranging their records in 1967/68.

Later in 1967, The Mindbenders released their cover version of "The Letter" which fell short at No. 42 in the UK singles chart (the last time The Mindbenders registered a single in the UK charts), whilst The Box Tops original reached the UK Top 10. A couple more flops followed and in March 1968, Lang quit and was replaced by Graham Gouldman.  With Gouldman on bass, but with Ric Dixon producing, the band recorded Gouldman's composition "Uncle Joe, the Ice Cream Man" as their final single.

On 20 November 1968, The Mindbenders broke up at the final concert of a UK tour with The Who, Arthur Brown and Joe Cocker.

Aftermath
Stewart and Gouldman played together in Hotlegs and later went on to form 10cc.

Lang later joined another rock music outfit, Racing Cars. Lang did not play with the band for long, however, and did not feature on any of their recordings. They had one hit single, "They Shoot Horses, Don't They?", which reached No. 14 in the UK Singles Chart in 1977.

Personnel
Wayne Fontana (born Glyn Geoffrey Ellis, 28 October 1945, Levenshulme, Manchester Lancashire, died 6 August 2020) – vocals, tambourine (1963–1965)
Bob Lang (born Robert Francis Lang, 10 January 1946, Levenshulme, Manchester, Lancashire) – bass (1963–1968)
Ric Rothwell (born Eric Rothwell, 11 March 1944, Reddish, Stockport, Cheshire) – drums (1963–1967)
Eric Stewart (born Eric Michael Stewart, 20 January 1945, Droylsden, Lancashire) – guitars, vocals (1963–1968)
Paul Hancox (born 25 October 1950, Birmingham, Warwickshire) – drums (1967–1968)
Graham Gouldman (born Graham Keith Gouldman, 10 May 1946, Broughton, Salford, Lancashire) – bass (1968)
Jimmy O'Neil (born James Andrew O'Neil, 6 July 1945, Birmingham, Warwickshire d. January 2016, The Philippines) – organ (1968)
Ted Lee (born Edward James Lee, 26 December 1940, Openshaw, Manchester) – bass

Timeline

Discography

Studio albums
Wayne Fontana and the Mindbenders
Wayne Fontana and the Mindbenders (label has: Um, Um, Um, Um, Um, Um – It's Wayne Fontana and the Mindbenders) – 1965 (UK Fontana TL5230)
The Game of Love – 1965 (US Fontana MGF 27542 (Mono)/SRF 67542 (Stereo))
Eric, Rick, Wayne and Bob – It's Wayne Fontana and the Mindbenders – 1965 (UK Fontana TL5257)

The Mindbenders
The Mindbenders (UK Fontana STL 5324) – June 1966
A Groovy Kind of Love (US Fontana MGF 27554 (Mono) / SRF 67554 (Stereo)) – US No. 92, July 1966
Original copies feature "Don't Cry No More", replaced with "Ashes to Ashes" on later pressings
With Woman in Mind (UK Fontana STL 5403) – April 1967

Compilation albums
Hit Single Anthology (Europe Fontana 848 161–2) – 1991
The Best of Wayne Fontana & The Mindbenders (US Fontana 314 522 666–2) – 1994

Appearances
To Sir, with Love: Original Motion Picture Soundtrack (US Fontana SRF-67569 / UK Fontana STL-5446) - 1967

Singles
Wayne Fontana and the Mindbenders

The Mindbenders

See also
List of music artists and bands from Manchester
List of artists who reached number one in the United States
List of performers on Top of the Pops

Notes

A   Re-recorded version.

References

External links
 as Wayne Fontana & The Mindbenders
 as The Mindbenders
  as Wayne Fontana & The Mindbenders
  as The Mindbenders
  as Wayne Fontana and The Mindbenders
  as The Mindbenders
  as Wayne Fontana

1963 establishments in England
1968 disestablishments in England
Musical groups from Manchester
Musical groups established in 1963
Musical groups disestablished in 1968
English pop music groups
Beat groups
British Invasion artists
Fontana Records artists